Manhattan Madness is a 1916 silent film comedy directed by Allan Dwan and starring Douglas Fairbanks. It was produced by Fine Arts Film Company and distributed by Triangle Film Corporation.

The film is preserved at George Eastman House and Museum of Modern Art.

Cast
Douglas Fairbanks - Steve O'Dare
Jewel Carmen - The Girl
George Beranger - The Butler
Ruth Darling - The Maid
Eugene Ormonde - Count Marinoff
Macey Harlam - The Villain
Warner Richmond - Jack Osborne
John Richmond - Cupid Russell
Albert MacQuarrie -

References

External links
 Manhattan Madness at IMDb.com

1916 films
American silent feature films
Films directed by Allan Dwan
Triangle Film Corporation films
American black-and-white films
Silent American comedy films
1916 comedy films
1910s American films